is a Japanese television drama series premiered on TBS on 20 January 2012. Yukie Nakama played the lead role.

Cast
 Yukie Nakama as Rin Kinoshita
 Kuranosuke Sasaki as Naoya Matsumoto
 Mikako Ichikawa as Miho Watanabe
 Kento Nagayama as Shunpei Makino
 Yuji Tanaka as Kouta Tada
 Ryō as Nanako Aizawa
 Shigeru Muroi as Hiromi Amamiya
 Jun Hashimoto as Junichirō Kamiyama
 Jutta Yuuki as Akira Takahashi
 Takuma Sasaki as Dai Nakamura
 Shuhei Minami as Tōru Koizumi
 Oonishi as Hajime Tanabe
 Tsubasa Honda as Yui Kinoshita
 Jun Nishiyama as Itsuki Kinoshita
 Eiji Moriyama as Takashi Kobayakawa
 Tasuku Nagase as Takuya Yamada
 Anna Nose as Saori Kawashima

References

External links
  

2012 Japanese television series debuts
Kin'yō Dorama
Japanese romantic comedy television series
2012 Japanese television series endings